Chandrakant Raghunath Gokhale (7 January 1921 – 20 June 2008) was a well-known veteran Marathi film and stage actor and singer.

Gokhale's mother, Kamlabai Gokhale (nee Kamlabai Kamat) was the first female child actor of the Indian cinema. Gokhale has acted in several superhit marathi films such as "Dhakti Jau" and many more. His son Vikram Gokhale was also involved with Marathi theatre and the Indian cinema.

References

1921 births
2008 deaths
Male actors from Maharashtra
Indian male stage actors
Male actors in Marathi cinema
Male actors in Marathi theatre
Marathi actors